Fisherman's Friends: One and All is a 2022 British film directed by Nick Moorcroft and Meg Leonard from a screenplay by Moorcroft, Leonard and Piers Ashworth. The film stars James Purefoy, David Hayman, Dave Johns, Sam Swainsbury, Maggie Steed, Jade Anouka and Ramon Tikaram, with Irish singer-songwriter Imelda May making her acting debut. The sequel to the 2019 film Fisherman's Friends, the film follows the continued career of Fisherman's Friends up to their performance at the Glastonbury Festival in 2011.

Cast

Production
Principal photography on the film started on 7 April 2021 on location in Port Isaac, Cornwall and London for six weeks.

Reception

References

British comedy-drama films
2020s English-language films
Films set in Cornwall
2022 comedy-drama films
2020s British films